Hill Croome  is a village, and a civil parish which covers 1000 acres, in the Malvern Hills District in  the county of Worcestershire, England. Historically a parish in the lower division of the hundred of Oswaldslow, according to the 2001 census the parish had a population of 169. Hill Croome was once part of the Royal forest of Horewell.

History

A heritable messuage of land and a close in the hamlet of Baughton, which also lies in Hill Croome parish, were held in 1591 by John Turberville and his wife Joan under a lease from Thomas Walshe, Lord the Manor of Hill Croome.

References

Villages in Worcestershire